

Events

Births

Deaths
John Julian, mixed-blood pirate who operated in the New World.

See also
Timeline of piracy

References

Piracy
Piracy by year